Lucas Gilbertson is a Canadian voice actor known for his work in anime dubs and video games. He is best known as a voice of Zero in the Mega Man X series. 

In 2001 Gilbertson's older sister, an established actress and singer in Calgary, told him about open auditions for Blue Water Studios. Two weeks after auditioning he got his first voice acting job which was on a Gundam anime.

Gilbertson married fellow voice actress Carol-Anne Day in late 2020 and together they formed their own production company called the Hermit Collective to create more opportunities for local performers.

As of 2020, Gilbertson also began work as a video game developer creating LampBlack

Filmography

Anime roles
Banner of the Stars - Admiral Rulef
Cardfight!! Vanguard - Katsumi Morikawa
Di Gi Charat Nyo! - Gema
D.I.C.E. - Chao Lee
Doki Doki School Hours - Gen Nakamura
Dragon Ball - Yajirobe (Blue Water dub)
Flame of Recca - Kashamura
Full Moon O Sagashite - Shiragami
Future Card Buddyfight - Demon Lord, Asmodai
Gintama° - Shigeshige Tokugawa
Hoop Days - Kenji Dobashi
Hunter × Hunter - #294: Hanzo
Hello Carbot - Duke
Jubei-chan - Shiratoya Batten
Gregory Horror Show - Black Duck 2
Kiznaiver - Hajime Tenga
Mobile Suit Zeta Gundam - Additional voices
The Law of Ueki - Guitar
Tobot* - Tobot K
Something About Mega Man X Animated- TerminalMontage

Video games
Mega Man X4 - Zero (Redubbed voice)
Mega Man X8 - Zero
Mega Man X: Command Mission - Zero
Mega Man Maverick Hunter X - Zero
Mobile Suit Gundam Seed: Never Ending Tomorrow
Dynasty Warriors: Gundam - Johnny Ridden
Dynasty Warriors: Gundam 2 - Johnny Ridden
Dynasty Warriors: Gundam 3 - Knight Gundam
We Love Golf! - Tony

References

External links
 Official website
 
 
 Lucas Gilbertson at Crystal Acid Database
 
 
 

Living people
Canadian male video game actors
Canadian male voice actors
21st-century Canadian male actors
Year of birth missing (living people)